J R Roberts Stores opened in 1870 in Stratford, London as a drapery and furniture shop at 96 Broadway, before expanding and becoming a full line department store covering 78-102 Broadway.

In 1888, it is reported that J R Roberts opened the first Christmas grotto in a UK department store. Later their Christmas fairs were known for animated soldiers, sailors and other toy figures. During the early part of the 20th century, the postcard artist Hermann Fleury Jnr fitted out the Christmas display for a fee of £200.

In 1895, Queen Mary Hospital at West Ham opened a new wing and the two main wards were named after J R Roberts who had paid for the furniture.

The business expanded in 1899 when they opened a second store in Nelson Street, Southend-on-Sea, as a subsidiary (Company no. 00338672) of the Stratford branch. They also announced they would stop selling alcohol in their Stratford store as part of the temperance movement. In 1933 they moved from Nelson Street to 90 High Street, Southend, which had been home to Percy Ravens since 1900. In 1950 the business was purchased by retail group Hide & Co.

In 1954, J R Roberts closed their Stratford store and sold it to the London Co-operative Society (who demolished the old buildings and built a new department store between 1957 and 1962), The Southend store became part of House of Fraser in 1975 after they purchased Hide & Co, and was renamed Chiesmans before becoming Army & Navy. 
The premises have since been occupied by Dixons / Currys and Morrisons Local.

References

Defunct retail companies of the United Kingdom
Defunct department stores of the United Kingdom
Retail companies established in 1870
Companies with year of disestablishment missing
House of Fraser
Shops in London
Department stores in Southend-On-Sea (town)
1870 establishments in England